Oleksandr Kalashnykov (1890s1920) was a Ukrainian anarchist and a commander of the 1st Donetsk Corps of the Revolutionary Insurgent Army of Ukraine.

Biography
Oleksandr Kalashnykov was born at the end of the nineteenth century in the city of Baku. The son of a worker, he came to live in Huliaipole, before going to fight on the Eastern Front of World War I as a non-commissioned officer. After the February Revolution, he returned to Huliaipole, where he became the secretary of the Union of Poor Peasants. With the town's anarchist group, Kalashnykov organized an agricultural commune on the Klassen estate. 

Following the invasion of Ukraine by the Central Powers, Kalashnykov was arrested by the newly-established Ukrainian State and imprisoned in Oleksandrivsk, where he awaited execution alongside Savelii Makhno. But in November 1918, the authorities were overthrown by the Directorate of Ukraine and all political prisoners were freed. These included Kalashnykov and Makhno, who immediately returned home to Huliaipole and joined the insurgents led by Savelii's brother Nestor. On 27 December 1918, Kalashnykov led a partisan band on a morning train to Katerynoslav, which they bloodlessly captured from the Ukrainian People's Army.

Following the integration of the anarchists into the 3rd Trans-Dnieper Brigade, in February 1919, Kalashnykov was elected the commander of the brigade's 7th Regiment. On 15 March, the 7th Regiment moved against Berdiansk. On the outskirts of Berdiansk, Kalashnykov's Regiment held off from entering the city until 28 March, in order to allow the civilian inhabitants to escape. In Berdiansk, Kalashnykov was instructed to arrest and prosecute everyone who collaborated with the White movement. During the city's occupation, Kalashnykov was alleged to have committed a number of war crimes, including the torture and execution of captured prisoners of war.

At the end of March, Kalashnykov and his regiment went to Mariupol. At the beginning of June, there were already 7,000 Makhnovists in the 7th Regiment.  In August, the political commissar of the 7th Regiment, Kochergin, ordered the arrest of Kalashnykov. But before this could happen, Kalashnykov led his regiment in a mutiny against the Red command, capturing Kochergin's headquarters in Novyi Buh. Members of the Regiment wanted to shoot him and his wife, but Kalashnykov stood up for them and spared their lives. On 30 August, at the Pomichna station, Kalashnykov fought two armored trains with several echelons of Red Army soldiers who were retreating from Odesa.

On 1 September, a meeting of rebels took place in Dobrovelychkivka, where the restructuring of the army and further actions of the Makhnovists were discussed. Kalashnykov was elected commander of the newly created 1st Donetsk Corps. Following the Battle of Peregonovka, the head of the RIAU set the task for Kalashnykov to move north and occupy Katerynoslav, but he did not complete the task. Ignoring orders, he instead moved to Kryvyi Rih and occupied it. The Kherson group was allocated to Camelyuzhki, which was supposed to turn it toward Katerynoslav. 

On 1 October, a commission was created to investigate the reasons for Kalashnykov's non-execution of the order, on the same day it was disbanded, and Viktor Bilash limited himself to issuing a severe reprimand in the order. In mid-October, the command was still expecting that Kalashnykov would go to Katerynoslav, but this did not happen. On 10 October, he arrived in Oleksandrivsk where he explained his actions:

In November, Kalashnykov was appointed head of the defense of Oleksandrivsk. On 29 May 1920, the Makhnovists occupied Oleksandrivka, in which they elected a new composition of the Military Revolutionary Council. Kalashnykov was elected head of the operational department of the SRPU. By the beginning of the Bolshevik–Makhnovist conflict, the SRPU was at the head of all the rebel detachments, which Kalashnykov had been part of since summer.

At the end of June 1920, he died in Barvinkove.

References

Bibliography

 
 
 

1890s births
1920 deaths
Anarchist partisans
Makhnovshchina
People from Baku
Soviet military personnel of the Russian Civil War
Ukrainian anarchists
Ukrainian military leaders
Year of birth unknown